Trust International Paper Corporation (TIPCO) is a Philippine pulp and paper company which is known for manufacturing newsprint, newsprint, printing and writing-grade paper from recycled materials.

History
Trust International Paper Corporation was established in 1978 in Mabalacat, Pampanga by Elon Ting and Sylvia S. Y. Chen.

In the early 2000s, its overseas market include Singapore, Taiwan, Hong Kong, mainland China, Thailand, Malaysia, India and Hawaii in the United States.

American-born Filipino Mayleen Ting, the daughter of the founders, took over TIPCO's management in 2008.

TIPCO in 2014 sought government intervention on newsprint imports through safeguard measures that would impose higher duties on imported newsprint arguing the level of importation is hurting the domestic industry. The national government did grant the safeguard measure but to a lesser extent than TIPCO proposed which led to the company to defer its investment plans.

In 2014, TIPCO reportedly is the largest paper company in the Philippines, having an annual production capacity of 230,000 MT for paper-based products including newsprint and writing paper.
 
In 2020, due to lessened global demand due caused by the COVID-19 pandemic, TIPCO suspended all of its production with plans to resume operation on late 2021.

References

Pulp and paper companies of the Philippines
1987 establishments in the Philippines
Companies based in Pampanga